The Open Web Foundation (OWF) is an American non-profit organization dedicated to the development and protection of specifications for emerging web technologies. The foundation follows an open source model similar to the Apache Software Foundation (ASF). Individuals participating include Geir Magnusson, vice president and board member at Apache, and Tim O'Reilly, CEO of O'Reilly Media.

History
The Open Web Foundation was announced July 24, 2008 at the O'Reilly Open Source Convention (OSCON). Facebook has announced their support for the OWF, as well as Google, MySpace, Six Apart, Plaxo and others. Through OWF, Google and Facebook now have an appropriate venue where they can resolve their differences between Facebook Connect and OpenSocial platforms, as well as work on a standard way to have their users interact with each other. The OWF also provides the technical details, as well as policy details, on how these protocols and emerging technologies interact.

Criticism
In 2008, Microsoft's Dare Obasanjo made accusations that employees of the Open Web Foundation were bypassing the IETF or other regulatory standards.

Industry support
According to its web site, the Open Web Foundation is supported by the following companies and organizations:
 BBC
 Facebook
 Google
 Microsoft
 MySpace
 O'Reilly
 Plaxo
 Six Apart
 SourceForge
 Vidoop
 Yahoo

Governance 
The Open Web Foundation is a membership-based organization. Members of the Foundation elect a nine-person Board.

Members of the current Board, elected as of August 17, 2009:
 Brady Brim-DeForest
 Tantek Celik
 DeWitt Clinton
 Chris Messina
 David Recordon
 Lawrence Rosen
 David Rudin
 Gabe Wachob

See also
 Apache Software Foundation
 History of the World Wide Web
 Open standard
 Web platform

References

External links
 The Open Web Foundation Web Site

Free software project foundations in the United States
Organizations established in 2008